The civil war in Poland was a military conflict from 1704 to 1706, and a part of a larger European conflict, the Great Northern War. It focused on the struggle for the Polish throne between King Stanisław I supported by his Warsaw Confederation and Sweden, and the Russian-backed Sandomierz Confederation of Augustus II the Strong. The war ended with Stanisław's victory and the Treaty of Altranstädt in 1706 in which August II renounced his claims to the Polish throne. Stanisław's triumph would be short-lived, however, as by 1709 he would be forced to give up the throne to Augustus II once again.

Background

At the onset of the Great Northern War, Augustus the Strong was king of Poland, Grand Duke of Lithuania and Elector of Saxony, having been elected in 1697. In 1699, he allied with the Russian tsar Peter the Great in the Treaty of Preobrazhenskoye and with Frederik IV of Denmark-Norway in the Treaty of Dresden, and joined their war with the Swedish Empire that followed in 1700 Soon, however, their alliance suffered a number of defeats, and led to Charles XII of Sweden invasion of Poland.

Civil war

Swedish successes (in particular, the Battle of Klissow) led to a growing number of Polish-Lithuanian magnates switching sides, culminating in the formation of Warsaw Confederation on 16 February 1704 and the election of Swedish-endorsed voivode of Poznań, Stanisław I, as the new Polish king on 12 July 1704.

Augustus the Strong still enjoyed support of a Polish faction, the Sandomierz Confederation (formed on 20 May 1704), and about 75% of the Polish army. Augustus and his supporters declared war on Sweden, and joined the anti-Swedish Russian coalition at Narva on 30 August 1704.

By October 1703 Augustus had to abandon Warsaw. A Russo-Saxo-Polish-Lithuanian army was then assembled at Polotsk (Polatsk, Połock, Polockas), another allied army in Saxony, and a third allied force commanded by General Otto Arnold von Paykull (Pajkul) advanced towards Warsaw, where Charles XII and Stanisław sojourned. Pajkul's Saxo-Polish-Lithuanian forces reached the outskirts of Warsaw on 31 July 1705, where they were defeated. The army at Polotsk was denied westward advance by Swedish forces under Adam Ludwig Lewenhaupt. Thus, Stanisław was crowned king of Poland in Warsaw on 4 October 1705 soon afterward he and his supporters concluded an alliance with the Swedish Empire in the Treaty of Warsaw in November 1705.

Augustus was not done yet. In early 1706 he approached Warsaw with a cavalry force and ordered Johann Matthias von der Schulenburg to move the army assembled in Saxony into Poland–Lithuania. Schulenburg was intercepted and defeated by Carl Gustav Rehnskiöld in the Battle of Fraustadt (Wschowa) on 13 February 1706. The army assembled in Polotsk had been moved to Grodno where it was tactically defeated and forced to withdraw eastwards around the same time. Charles XII then occupied Saxony, forcing Augustus to abandon both the Polish crown and his allies in the Treaty of Altranstädt on 13 October 1706 in which Augustus was forced to give up his claims to the Polish crown.

Aftermath
Stanisław's reign was short; in 1709 the Russians decisive victory at the Battle of Poltava undermined his position in Poland. Soon after the Swedish defeat, Stanisław I abandoned Poland, and Augustus resumed his position as the Polish king. Augustus position was backed up by the Russians, who would assume an increasingly dominating role in Polish internal politics following this conflict.

In popular culture
The civil war, together with a later War of the Polish Succession (1733–1738) in which Leszczyński challenged Augustus' son, was immortalized in a Polish saying "Jedni do Sasa, drudzy do Lasa" (lit. "Some to Sas, other to Las"; with "Sas", meaning "the Saxon, being Augustus' nickname, and "Las", short for "Leszczyński", Stanisław's family name), denoting a state of division, disorder and anarchy. Another variant of the saying is "Od Sasa do Lasa" (lit. "From Sas to Las").

See also
 Battle of Kalisz
 History of Poland (1648-1764)
 Silent Sejm
 Campaign of Grodno

References

Bibliography
 
 
 

Wars involving the Polish–Lithuanian Commonwealth
Great Northern War
Civil wars involving the states and peoples of Europe
Wars involving Saxony
Wars involving Sweden
Wars involving Russia
Conflicts in 1704
Conflicts in 1705
Conflicts in 1706
1704 in the Polish–Lithuanian Commonwealth
1705 in the Polish–Lithuanian Commonwealth
1706 in the Polish–Lithuanian Commonwealth
Wars of succession involving the states and peoples of Europe